Brett Ryan Ormerod (born 18 October 1976) is an English retired professional footballer. A forward, he made 340 appearances in the Football League, including 215 for Blackpool, for whom he is the only player to have scored in all of the top four divisions of English football for the same club.

In his 20-year-long playing career, Ormerod played for Accrington Stanley, Southampton, Leeds United, Wigan Athletic, Preston North End, Nottingham Forest, Oldham Athletic, Rochdale, Wrexham, Padiham and Bamber Bridge.

Early life
Ormerod went to school at Norden High School where he met Lisa Standring, who later became his wife. He has brothers named Darren and Paul and his mum is Kathy. Ormerod worked at Hall and Letts textile factory in Great Harwood where he claimed to have earned £130 a week.

Club career

Accrington Stanley
Born in Blackburn, Lancashire, Ormerod was released by hometown club, Blackburn Rovers, and signed for Accrington Stanley in 1995 playing semi-professionally. He made 54 league appearances, scoring 32 goals. While at Accrington he worked in a cotton mill to supplement playing part-time in non-league football. He was spotted playing by Gordon Strachan who vowed that his first task in getting back into management would be to buy Ormerod.

Blackpool
Ormerod signed for Blackpool, who were then in Division Two, on 21 March 1997 for £50,000, making his debut as an 82nd-minute substitute on 29 March in a 0–0 draw with Chesterfield at Saltergate. His first league goal came the following season in a 1–1 draw with Carlisle United on 26 December 1997 at Brunton Park.

He became a regular first-team player in the 1998–99 season, when he made 40 league appearances and scored eight goals.

He spent four years with Blackpool, however he suffered a badly broken leg, breaking his tibia and fibula, in October 1999 that kept him out of the team in the 1999–2000 season when the club were relegated to the Third Division, something Ormerod would later describe as, "probably the lowest point of my career". He made his return the following season, and after signing a contract extension in January 2001, he helped the club to promotion through the play-offs. He scored the club's fourth goal in their 4–2 win over Leyton Orient in the Play-Off final at the Millennium Stadium, Cardiff on 26 May 2001.

Ormerod made a blistering start to the 2001–02 season, and he was linked with a move to Wigan Athletic in November 2001, who were reported to have bid £1.5m for him. They were one of four clubs to have made an approach for Ormerod, with Premier League club Southampton having had a £1m bid rejected. Blackpool chairman Karl Oyston said on the club's official website: "We don't have to sell Brett and we don't need to sell him. It's testament to the club's achievements and how the team are playing that other clubs are looking at players at this club." However, despite this, Ormerod was signed by Southampton for £1.75m on 7 December 2001. He had made a total of 150 appearances for The Seasiders scoring 62 goals in all competitions. 21 games 13 goals had come in the 2001–02 campaign.

Southampton
Gordon Strachan, then Southampton manager had kept his word about signing Ormerod, who made his debut for The Saints on 15 December 2001 as an 84th-minute substitute in a 2–0 home victory over Sunderland. After a number of substitute appearances, he finally made his full debut on 2 March 2002, when he also scored his first goal for the club, in a 3–1 win over Ipswich Town at Portman Road. He did not score again though until the following season, when he scored five goals in two games. On 2 October, he grabbed a hat-trick as The Saints beat Tranmere Rovers 6–1 in the second round of the 2002–03 Football League Cup. He followed that up three days later by scoring both goals as Southampton beat Manchester City 2–0 at St Mary's Stadium.

On 13 April 2003, after enduring a 24-game goalless drought Ormerod scored one goal and laid up another as Southampton beat Watford 2–1 in the semi-final of the 2002–03 FA Cup at Villa Park. Ormerod then appeared in the FA Cup Final on 17 May at the Millennium Stadium, Cardiff, which Southampton lost 1–0 to a Robert Pires goal in the 37th minute.

Ormerod found first-team opportunities limited at Southampton and on 19 September 2004, in an attempt to secure some first-team football, he joined Leeds United on a one-month loan deal. Ormerord missed a penalty on his Leeds debut, making six appearances. On 18 March 2005 he joined Wigan Athletic on loan for one month with a view to a permanent move. The move was intended to last until the end of the season and he made six appearances, scoring two goals in their 2–0 win against Leicester City at the Walkers Stadium on 16 April, before being recalled by Southampton manager Harry Redknapp on 26 April following an injury to Peter Crouch.

After Southampton finished bottom of the Premier League in 2004–05 and were relegated to the Championship, he was able to play more often after the sale of several teammates who had been keeping him out of the team. Ormerod said of his time with the club, "I had some of the best years of my career at Southampton. It's a big club with great supporters. If I had my time again I would do exactly the same again, particularly as I got to play in a cup final."

Preston North End
On 27 January 2006, Ormerod was snapped up on a free transfer by Preston North End, the arch-rivals of his former club Blackpool. After signing a three-and-a-half year contract, he said of the move, "It's a new start for me. Preston are a good team and I'm just really happy to be here." Four days later he scored just thirteen minutes into his debut as they beat Crystal Palace 2–0 at Deepdale.

On 8 May, he broke his leg, ten minutes into Preston's 0–2 playoff semi-final second leg defeat to Leeds United, following a tackle by Leeds' Jonathan Douglas. He made his return the following season as a 70th-minute substitute in a 4–1 home win over Sunderland on 14 October, and scored his first goal of the season in a 3–2 defeat to Burnley at Turf Moor on 27 October. He fractured his cheekbone fifteen minutes into the 0–1 home defeat to Wolverhampton Wanderers on 10 February 2007.

After making twenty league and cup appearances, scoring one goal in the 2007–08 season, Ormerod signed on loan for Nottingham Forest on 7 March 2008, until the end of the season. He scored two goals for Forest in thirteen appearances against Walsall and Northampton Town, with his decent form helping Forest gain promotion to the Championship.

On 15 October 2008 he joined League One club Oldham Athletic on a one-month loan deal, after falling out of favour at Preston and without making one appearance in the 2008–09 season. He made two starts and three substitute appearances for The Latics, but was forced to return to Preston earlier than scheduled after sustaining a broken toe in training in early November. His last game for Preston came in March 2008, he scored a total of thirteen goals in 62 league appearances.

Return to Blackpool
On 30 January 2009, after being released by Preston by mutual consent, Ormerod rejoined his first professional club, Blackpool, on a permanent deal until the end of the 2008–09 season. He made his debut for Blackpool the following day as a 90th-minute substitute in The Seasiders' single-goal victory over Crystal Palace at Selhurst Park.

On 7 March 2009 he scored the first goal in Blackpool's 2–0 victory over Norwich City at Bloomfield Road. It was his 100th league goal and his first goal since returning to the club. On 25 April, Ormerod's goal in a 1–1 home draw with Nottingham Forest that secured The Seasiders another season in the Championship.

On 24 June Ormerod signed a new one-year contract, with an option for a further year, with Blackpool manager Ian Holloway saying, "I am delighted that Brett has signed again. He was a key player in the side that did well for the club towards the end of last season. He wants to be here, and is everything Blackpool stands for.'"

Ormerod scored what proved to be the winning goal in the 45th minute of the 2010 Football League Championship play-off Final against Cardiff City on 22 May.

On 14 August, he became the first player to have played for the club in all four divisions, in Blackpool's Premier League debut, a 4–0 win over Wigan Athletic at the DW Stadium.

On 22 February 2011, he became the first Blackpool player to score for the club in all four divisions, after scoring their third goal against Tottenham Hotspur at Bloomfield Road. At the end of the 2011–12 season his contract with The Seasiders expired,.

On 3 January 2012, Ormerod joined League One outfit Rochdale on loan for 28 days, joining Blackpool teammate Daniel Bogdanović.

Wrexham
On 2 July 2012, he signed a two-year deal with  Wrexham  of the Football Conference.

Ormerod made his Wrexham debut on the opening day of the 2012–13 season, playing 75 minutes of the 3–1 victory over Woking. Ormerod scored his first goal for the club in the FA Cup against Southport. His first league goal in the fifth division came in an away 5–1 win over Braintree Town in November 2012. His next goal came in a boxing day home match against AFC Telford United, a game which he scored a double. In March 2013 Ormerod played at Wembley for the third time in as many years in the FA Trophy Final against Grimsby Town, the game ended 1–1 and Wrexham eventually won on penalties extending Ormerod's trophy collection. Ormerod left Wrexham by mutual consent in April 2014.

Padiham
After leaving Wrexham, Ormerod signed for Padiham in the Northern Premier League Division 1 North.

Retirement and coaching career
On 21 January 2016, Ormerod confirmed his decision to retire, stating "At 39, it's time to hang up the boots, a big thanks to family and friends and everyone who has supported me, it's been a crazy ride thanks!".

In October 2019, Ormerod and John Hills became caretaker managers of AFC Fylde following the departure of Dave Challinor, leading them to a 6–1 victory over Peterborough Sports in the FA Cup and a 2–0 league win over Boreham Wood in the National Conference League. On 19 December 2019, Ormerod returned to Bamber Bridge when he was added to Jamie Milligan's first team staff on a part-time basis.

Honours
Southampton
 FA Cup finalist: 2003

Blackpool
 Football League Third Division play-offs: 2000–01
 Football League Championship play-offs: 2009–10

Wrexham
FA Trophy: 2013

References

External links

Brett Ormerod player profile at pnefc.net
Brett Ormerod player profile at nottinghamforest.co.uk
Brett Ormerod player profile at blackpoolfc.co.uk

1976 births
Living people
Footballers from Blackburn
English footballers
Association football forwards
Accrington Stanley F.C. players
Blackpool F.C. players
Southampton F.C. players
Leeds United F.C. players
Wigan Athletic F.C. players
Preston North End F.C. players
Nottingham Forest F.C. players
Oldham Athletic A.F.C. players
Rochdale A.F.C. players
Wrexham A.F.C. players
Padiham F.C. players
Bamber Bridge F.C. players
Premier League players
English Football League players
National League (English football) players
AFC Fylde managers
English football managers
FA Cup Final players